Friska (from , fresh, pronounced frish) is the fast section of the csárdás, a Hungarian folk dance, or of most of (all except for 3, 5 and 17) Liszt's Hungarian Rhapsodies, which take their form from this dance. The friska is generally either turbulent or jubilant in tone. The Friska of Hungarian Rhapsody No. 2 is also the most well-known of the Hungarian Rhapsodies.

See also 
 Lassan

zh-yue:查達斯
Hungarian styles of music
Hungarian words and phrases